Route 87 is a state highway located in Atlantic County in the U.S. state of New Jersey. It runs , heading north from Atlantic City at an intersection with U.S. Route 30 to Brigantine, where it terminates at the end of the Brigantine Bridge over the Absecon Inlet, continuing as County Route 638. In Atlantic City, the route runs through the Marina District, which contains a few casinos, along Huron Avenue and Brigantine Boulevard. Here, Route 87 intersects with Route 187 and the Atlantic City-Brigantine Connector, the latter providing a limited-access route between Route 87 and the Atlantic City Expressway. Route 87 is the only road to and from Brigantine.

What is now Route 87 was initially proposed as Route S4A in 1927, running from Tuckerton south through Brigantine to Atlantic City. The portion of this route south of Little Beach was to be built by Atlantic County; however, the state took over plans of building the road in 1938. Despite this, Route S4A was never completed between Brigantine and Little Beach, and the portion of the road that existed in Ocean County was removed from the state highway system by 1941. In 1945, Route S56 was proposed to run from Atlantic City to Brigantine along Brigantine Boulevard. Route 87 was created on its current alignment in 1953 as an unsigned route, replacing the other two routes. Previously, Route 87 split into two alignments in Atlantic City along Huron Avenue and Brigantine Boulevard; the Brigantine Boulevard alignment eventually became Route 187.

Route description
Route 87 begins at an intersection with U.S. Route 30 in Atlantic City, heading to the northeast on Huron Avenue, an undivided road with two northbound lanes and three southbound lanes. Immediately after beginning, it passes under the Atlantic City – Brigantine Connector and comes to a ramp that provides access from southbound Route 87 to the southbound connector. From here, the route widens to seven lanes, with two northbound lanes and five southbound lanes. It passes by the Borgata casino, with a ramp from the casino to the northbound direction. The road becomes a four-lane divided highway and passes under a ramp from the Atlantic City – Brigantine Connector to the Borgata before heading under northbound direction of the connector. Here, a ramp from the connector provides access to Route 87. A short distance later, the route comes to the northern terminus of Route 187 and turns north to follow Brigantine Boulevard, which is a four-lane divided highway.

The route passes to the west of the Golden Nugget Atlantic City casino and comes to a ramp that provides access from northbound Route 87 to both the Golden Nugget Atlantic City and Harrah's Atlantic City casinos before passing under the northbound Atlantic City – Brigantine Connector again. Immediately after, the route has a ramp from the southbound direction that provides access to the connector and westbound U.S. Route 30. The northbound Atlantic City – Brigantine Connector parallels Route 87 to the east as it turns northeast and comes to a right-in/right-out in the southbound direction that serves both Harrah's and Borgata. From here, the route passes to the southeast of Harrah's. The northbound Atlantic City – Brigantine Connector merges onto northbound Route 87 before the route comes to a ramp that provides access to the northbound direction of the route from Harrah's. Past here, the route crosses over the Absecon Channel on the Justice Vincent S. Haneman Memorial Bridge and runs along the border of Atlantic City to the northwest and Brigantine to the southeast. After crossing the Absecon Channel, the route arrives on Brigantine Island and passes through wetlands, with U-turn ramps in both directions. A short distance later, Route 87 ends and County Route 638 continues along Brigantine Boulevard through Brigantine.

History

In 1927, a spur of Route 4, Route S4A, was proposed as a route running from Route 4 (now U.S. Route 9) in Tuckerton in Ocean County south to Little Beach. In 1929, this route was to continue south through Brigantine to Atlantic City, with the portion south of Little Beach to be built by Atlantic County. The state of New Jersey took over the proposed extension of Route S4A from Little Beach to Atlantic City in 1938. However, the portion of this route between Brigantine and the Atlantic/Ocean County line was never built, and the portion of road that existed in Ocean County, known as Great Bay Boulevard, was removed from the state highway system by 1941. In 1945, another route called Route S56, a spur of Route 56 (now U.S. Route 30), was proposed to run north along Brigantine Boulevard (present-day Route 187 and Route 87) from Atlantic City to Brigantine. In the 1953 New Jersey state highway renumbering, Route 87 was designated as an unsigned route along the former alignment of Route S4A and the proposed Route S56 between U.S. Route 30 in Atlantic City and Brigantine. Following the 1953 renumbering, the southern portion of Route 87 in Atlantic City split into two alignments, with one following Huron Avenue and the other following Brigantine Boulevard. Eventually, the alignment of Route 87 along Brigantine Boulevard between U.S. Route 30 and Huron Avenue became Route 187. In 2001, the Atlantic City – Brigantine Connector was completed, linking Route 87, the casinos in the Marina District, and Brigantine with the Atlantic City Expressway.

Junction list

See also

References

External links 

New Jersey Roads: Route 87
NJ State Highways: 75-90 - Route 87
New Jersey Highway Ends: Route 87
Speed Limits for State Roads: Route 87

087
Transportation in Atlantic County, New Jersey
Brigantine, New Jersey